SS Managua was a Nicaraguan cargo ship that the German submarine U-67 torpedoed on 16 June 1942 in the Straits of Florida while she was travelling from Charleston, South Carolina, United States to Havana, Cuba with a cargo of potash. The ship was built as Glorieta, a Design 1049 ship in 1919, operated by the United States Shipping Board (USSB) until sold to the Munson Steamship Line in 1920 and renamed Munisla. The ship was sold foreign to a Honduran company, Garcia, in 1937 and renamed Neptuno. In 1941 the ship was re-flagged in Nicaragua with the name Managua.

Construction 
Glorieta was built as the Emergency Fleet Corporation Design 1049 cargo ship at the Albina Engine & Machinery Works Inc. shipyard in Portland, Oregon as the yard's hull number 13 in 1919. Glorieta was launched and completed that same year, given U.S. Official Number 217829, signal LNQT with home port of New York, New York. Propulsion was by 1 x 3 cyl. triple expansion engine driving a screw propeller. The ship could reach a maximum speed of 12 knots and could generate 313 n.h.p.

Sinking 
Managua departed Charleston, South Carolina on 13 June 1942 for Havana, Cuba with a cargo of Potash with a stopover at Jacksonville, Florida. The following explosion broke the back of Managua which caused her to list to her port side and sank by the stern in 11 minutes. All 25 crew members safely evacuated the ship in two lifeboats and two rafts but weren't able to send a distress signal.

U-67 then surfaced and approached one of the lifeboats. The u-boat crew ordered two men from the lifeboats to come aboard for questioning. They were asked about the name of their vessel, their last port of departure, their destination, their cargo and if there were English or Americans amongst the crew. Afterwards they were allowed to return to the lifeboats with their fellow crewmen. The first lifeboat reached Matanzas, Cuba on 17 June followed by the second lifeboat at Pigeon Key, Florida that same day.

Wreck 

References

1919 ships
Design 1049 ships
Cargo ships
Steamships of the United States
Shipwrecks in the Atlantic Ocean
Ships sunk by German submarines in World War II
Ships sunk with no fatalities
Maritime incidents in June 1942
World War II shipwrecks in the Atlantic Ocean